Eresina is a genus of butterflies in the family Lycaenidae. The species of this genus are endemic to the Afrotropical realm.

Species
Eresina bergeri Stempffer, 1956
Eresina bilinea Talbot, 1935
Eresina conradti Stempffer, 1956
Eresina corynetes (Grose-Smith & Kirby, 1890)
Eresina crola Talbot, 1935
Eresina fontainei Stempffer, 1956
Eresina fusca (Cator, 1904)
Eresina jacksoni Stempffer, 1961
Eresina katangana Stempffer, 1956
Eresina katera Stempffer, 1962
Eresina likouala Stempffer, 1962
Eresina maesseni Stempffer, 1956
Eresina masaka Stempffer, 1962
Eresina pseudofusca Stempffer, 1961
Eresina rougeoti Stempffer, 1956
Eresina saundersi Stempffer, 1956
Eresina schmitti Larsen, 2005
Eresina theodori Stempffer, 1956
Eresina toroensis Joicey & Talbot, 1921

References

Poritiinae
Lycaenidae genera
Taxa named by Per Olof Christopher Aurivillius